Derrymore is a rural district of County Kerry in south-west Ireland. A sandy beach, known as Derrymore Strand, is quite popular with locals and tourists during the summer months. Derrymore Island is a nature reserve supporting many rare plant communities and is an important high-tide roosting area for shore birds.

The name Derrymore is an anglicization of the Irish doire mór, meaning "great oak grove".

References

Dingle Peninsula
Beaches of County Kerry